The Pax Britannica Trilogy comprises three books of history written by Jan Morris. The books cover the British Empire, from the earliest days of the East India Company to the troubled years of independence and nineteen-sixties post-colonialism. The books were written and published over a ten-year period, beginning in 1968 with Pax Britannica: The Climax of Empire.

The books in chronological order are;
Heaven’s Command: An Imperial Progress (1973)
Pax Britannica: The Climax of Empire (1968)
Farewell the Trumpets: An Imperial Retreat (1978)

References

External links
The Lectern: "The Pax Britannica Trilogy" James Morris

History books about the United Kingdom
Historiography of the British Empire